Andrew Allen (born 6 May 1981) is a Canadian singer-songwriter from Vernon, British Columbia. He is signed to Sony/ATV and has released five top ten singles, and written and recorded many others, including Where Did We Go? with Carly Rae Jepsen. He also records covers and posts them on YouTube.

Background 
Raised in British Columbia's Okanagan Valley, his acoustic pop/rock music is inspired by artists like Jason Mraz and Jack Johnson.

Career 
Andrew Allen scored his first hit in 2009, when I Wanna Be Your Christmas cracked the Top Ten in his native Canada. He was honored as the feature performer for the Sochi 2014 hand off finale on the internationally broadcast Closing Ceremony of the 2010 Paralympic Winter Games held at Whistler, British Columbia. Allen continued building an international profile in 2010, and released his biggest single Loving You Tonight, which sold more than 100,000 copies worldwide, was featured on the Gold Selling NOW 37, hit #6 on the Canadian charts for 22 weeks in a row and #30 on the US Hot AC charts, and got him a record deal with Epic after spending much of that year on the road. Because of the song's attention, Allen had the opportunity to perform with some of the world's biggest artists like Bruno Mars, One Republic, The Barenaked Ladies, Train, Matt Nathanson, Joshua Radin, Andy Grammer, The Script, Nick Carter, Kris Allen, Carly Rae Jepsen and many others.

Loving You Tonight was also featured on the soundtrack of Abduction starring Taylor Lautner.

Collaborations 
Andrew Allen is also well known in the songwriting community, and has written songs with artists like Meghan Trainor, Rachel Platten, Cody Simpson, Carly Rae Jepsen, Matt Simons, Conrad Sewell as well as writer/producers like Toby Gad, Ryan Stewart, Eric Rosse, Jason Reeves, John Shanks, Nolan Sipes, Mark Pellizzer (Magic), Brian West and Josh Cumbee. Numerous songs he has been a part of writing have been released by various artists, including Last Chance, which was on the Grammy nominated album Atmosphere by Kaskade feat. DJ Project 46, Ad Occhi Chiusi which was on the Double Platinum release by Italian artist Marco Mengoni and Maybe (which Allen also later released himself) released by teen pop sensation Daniel Skye, as well as many others.

Singles

I Wanna Be Your Christmas (2009)
Loving You Tonight (2010)
I Want You (2011)
Where Did We Go? (2012)
Satellite (2012)
Play with Fire (2013)
Thinking About You (2014)
What You Wanted (2016)
Favorite Christmas Song (2017)
Maybe (2017)

Discography

The Living Room Sessions (2008)
Andrew Allen EP (2009)
The Mix Tape (2012)
Are We Cool? (2013)
All Hearts Come Home (2014)
The Writing Room (2020)
12:34 (2022; pre-released on vinyl in 2021)

Songwriting credits

Last Chance released by Kaskade featuring Project 46 on his Grammy nominated record Atmosphere.
Ad Occhi Chiusi released by Marco Mengoni on his Double Platinum record.
Reasons released by Project 46.
No Ordinary Angel released by Nick Howard from The Voice Germany.
Million Dollars released by Nick Howard from The Voice Germany.
Maybe released by Daniel Skye.

References

1981 births
Living people
Canadian male singer-songwriters
Canadian singer-songwriters
Musicians from British Columbia
People from Vernon, British Columbia
21st-century Canadian male singers